Calothamnus quadrifidus subsp. petraeus is a plant in the myrtle family, Myrtaceae and is endemic to the south-west of Western Australia.  It is similar to other subspecies of Calothamnus quadrifidus except that its leaves are linear and somewhat rough and scaly and the stamen bundles are relatively long. (Subspecies seminudus is similar to petraeus but has smaller fruit.)

Description
The leaves, when mature, are either covered with long soft hairs or they are rough and scaly.

The flowers are red and arranged in clusters, usually on one side of the stem amongst the older leaves. The outer surface of the floral cup (the hypanthium) and the sepals are hairy.

Taxonomy and naming
Calothamnus quadrifidus subsp. petraeus was first formally described in 2010 by Alex George in Nuytsia from a specimen collected near Yellowdine. The epithet is said to be from the Greek petraeus, meaning "rocky", in reference to the occurrence on rock outcrops. The proper word in ancient Greek for "rocky" is however petraios (πετραῖος).

Distribution and habitat
Calothamnus quadrifidus subsp. petraeus occurs in the area between Karroun Hill Nature Reserve, Merredin and Yellowdine in the Avon Wheatbelt, Coolgardie and Mallee biogeographic regions. It grows in sand derived from granite or quartzite.

Conservation
Calothamnus quadrifidus subsp. petraeus is classified as "not threatened" by the Western Australian Government Department of Parks and Wildlife.

References

quadrifidus
Myrtales of Australia
Plants described in 2010
Plant subspecies